The Mongolian three-toed jerboa (Stylodipus sungorus) is a species of rodent in the family Dipodidae. It is found in Mongolia and possibly China.

References 

 Holden, M. E. and G. G. Musser. 2005. Family Dipodidae. pp. 871–893 in Mammal Species of the World a Taxonomic and Geographic Reference. D. E. Wilson and D. M. Reeder eds. Johns Hopkins University Press, Baltimore.

Stylodipus
Mammals of Mongolia
Mammals described in 1987
Taxonomy articles created by Polbot